Rex Benson may refer to:

 Sir Rex Benson (merchant banker) (1889–1968), English merchant banker and army officer
 Rex Benson (songwriter), American songwriter and music publisher